Katrin Wagner-Augustin (born 13 October 1977) is a German sprint canoer who has competed since the late 1990s.

Competing in four Summer Olympics, Wagner has six medals with four golds (K-2 500 m: 2000, K-4 500 m: 2000, 2004, and 2008), one silver (K-4 500 m: 2012) and one bronze (K-1 500 m: 2008).

Wagner-Augustin also won 26 medals at the ICF Canoe Sprint World Championships with ten golds (K-1 1000 m: 2005, K-1 4 × 200 m: 2009, 2010; K-4 200 m: 1997, 2005, 2007, 2009; K-4 500 m: 1997, 2005, 2007), fourteen silvers (K-1 500 m: 2009, K-1 1000 m: 2001, 2002, 2003, 2006; K-2 200 m: 2006, K-2 500 m: 2002, K-2 1000 m: 1999, K-4 500 m: 1999, 2001, 2002, 2006, 2009, 2010), and two bronzes (K-1 500 m: 2007, K-4 200 m: 2002).

References

External links
  
 
 
 
 

1977 births
Canoeists at the 2000 Summer Olympics
Canoeists at the 2004 Summer Olympics
Canoeists at the 2008 Summer Olympics
Canoeists at the 2012 Summer Olympics
German female canoeists
Living people
Olympic canoeists of Germany
Olympic gold medalists for Germany
Olympic bronze medalists for Germany
Sportspeople from Brandenburg an der Havel
Olympic medalists in canoeing
Olympic silver medalists for Germany
ICF Canoe Sprint World Championships medalists in kayak
Medalists at the 2012 Summer Olympics
Medalists at the 2008 Summer Olympics
Medalists at the 2004 Summer Olympics
Medalists at the 2000 Summer Olympics